Antônio Lima dos Santos, known as Lima (born 18 January 1942) is a Brazilian former professional footballer. Widely known for his versatility, he played mainly as a defensive midfielder, but also acted as a full-back at either sides and as a central defender.

Club career
Born in São Sebastião do Paraíso, Minas Gerais, Lima joined Juventus-SP's youth setup at early age and was promoted to the first team in 1959. In 1961, already a first-choice, he moved to Santos, becoming a starter at the right-back as the club's midfielder was captain Zito.

Lima only moved to his original position in 1965, after the arrival of Carlos Alberto Torres. He left the club in 1971 after accepting an offer from Jalisco, ending his time at Santos by playing nearly 700 matches and winning every title that a Brazilian club team could win at that time, most notably the Intercontinental Cup of 1962 and 1963; at the latter's final, he trademarked his versatility after playing as a striker.

In 1974, Lima returned to Brazil and joined Fluminense. In the following year, he represented Tampa Bay Rowdies for the final two matches of the 1975 NASL Indoor tournament, and ended his career with Portuguesa Santista.

International career
Lima earned 14 caps for the Brazil national team, and was part of the team at the 1966 FIFA World Cup.

References

External links

NASL stats

1942 births
Living people
Brazilian footballers
Association football defenders
Association football midfielders
Association football utility players
1966 FIFA World Cup players
Clube Atlético Juventus players
Santos FC players
Fluminense FC players
Associação Atlética Portuguesa (Santos) players
North American Soccer League (1968–1984) indoor players
Tampa Bay Rowdies (1975–1993) players
Brazil international footballers
Brazilian expatriate footballers
Brazilian expatriate sportspeople in Mexico
Brazilian expatriate sportspeople in the United States
Expatriate footballers in Mexico
Expatriate soccer players in the United States